This article shows the 2005 season of South Korean football. Ulsan Hyundai Horang-i became the champions of the 2005 K League, and Busan IPark reached to the semi-finals of the 2005 AFC Champions League. The South Korea national team qualified for the 2006 FIFA World Cup.

National team results

K League

Regular season

Championship playoffs

Bracket

Final table

Korean FA Cup

Korean League Cup

Korean Super Cup

K2 League

First stage

Second stage

Championship playoff

A3 Champions Cup

AFC Champions League

Group stage

Group E

Group G

Knockout stage

See also
Football in South Korea

References

External links

 
2005